Sepp Mühlbauer (20 May 1904 – 13 February 1995) was a Swiss ski jumper. He participated at the 1928 Winter Olympics in St. Moritz, where he placed seventh, with a first jump of 52 metres and a second jump of 58 metres. He represented the British Ski Club Of Great Britain.

References

External links

1904 births
1995 deaths
Swiss male ski jumpers
Olympic ski jumpers of Switzerland
Ski jumpers at the 1928 Winter Olympics